Darby v. Cisneros, 509 U.S. 137 (1993), was a case in which the United States Supreme Court held that federal courts cannot require that a plaintiff exhaust his administrative remedies before seeking judicial review when exhaustion of remedies is not required by either administrative rules or statute.

Facts of the case
R. Gordon Darby, a real estate developer in South Carolina, was banned from participating in Department of Housing and Urban Development programs for 18 months. He and others filed in federal court even though they had not exhausted the internal HUD review process. Henry Cisneros, as HUD Secretary, was the respondent.

See also
 List of United States Supreme Court cases, volume 509
 List of United States Supreme Court cases by the Rehnquist Court

Further reading

External links
 

United States Supreme Court cases
United States Supreme Court cases of the Rehnquist Court
United States administrative case law
1993 in United States case law
United States Department of Housing and Urban Development